The 1992 Australia rugby union tour of South Africa was a series of matches played by Australia in South Africa during August 1992. It was the first tour by the Wallabies to South Africa for 23 years.

Australia won all four matches, including the only test match.

Results 
Scores and results list Australia's points tally first.

Touring party 
Manager: John Breen
Coach: Bob Dwyer
Assistant coach: Bob Templeton

Tour matches

Test match

See also
History of rugby union matches between Australia and South Africa

References 

Australia national rugby union team tours
1992
tour
tour